Vista Lutheran Church is a historic church in Otisco Township, Minnesota, United States, built in 1908.  The Gothic Revival building was listed on the National Register of Historic Places in 1982 for having local significance in the themes of religion and European heritage.  It was nominated for being the best preserved structure symbolizing Waseca County's principal Swedish American settlement.

History
Otisco and New Richland townships were settled by Scandinavian pioneers in 1856 and 1857.  A wood-frame church was built on this site in 1868, and replaced in 1908 with this more permanent structure.  The church was named for Vista Hundred, a geographical division of Sweden from which many of the settlers had come.

Description
The interior has stenciling on the walls and the ceiling, and the carved pulpit sits high above the congregation.  The exterior uses red brick and stone.

See also
 List of Lutheran churches
 National Register of Historic Places listings in Waseca County, Minnesota

References

1908 establishments in Minnesota
Buildings and structures in Waseca County, Minnesota
Gothic Revival church buildings in Minnesota
Lutheran churches in Minnesota
Churches on the National Register of Historic Places in Minnesota
Churches completed in 1908
Swedish-American culture in Minnesota
National Register of Historic Places in Waseca County, Minnesota